The  Tampa Bay Storm season was the seventh season for the Arena Football League franchise. They finished 9–1 in the Southern Division, tied with the Orlando Predators, but Orlando won the division due to having scored more points than the Storm. The Storm would later beat Orlando in the league semi-final then win ArenaBowl VII against the Detroit Drive.

Regular season

Schedule

Standings

z – clinched homefield advantage

y – clinched division title

x – clinched playoff spot

Playoffs

Roster

Awards

References

External links
1993 Tampa Bay Storm season at arenafan.com

1993 Arena Football League season
Tampa Bay Storm seasons
ArenaBowl champion seasons
1993 in sports in Florida